El Mariachi is a Spanish-language crime drama television series created by Darío Vanegas and Lina Uribe based on the 1993 American film of the same name directed by Robert Rodriguez. It is a production between Teleset Colombia and Sony Pictures Television recorded in Mexico. The series is stars Iván Arana and Martha Higareda as main characters.

Plot 
The series revolves around of Martín (Iván Arana), a young man who is imprisoned by mistake. There, Martin will initiate an honest friendship with two inmates to face the dangers of prison, save his life and regain his freedom. In the midst of this chaos, Martín knows the love of his life, Celeste (Martha Higareda), who will believe him guilty of having committed a murder. Martín will fight to unmask those who made him go to prison and to recover his honor and the woman he loves.

Cast 
 Iván Arana as Martín Aguirre
 Martha Higareda as Celeste Sandoval
 Julio Bracho as Fernando Sandoval
 Gustavo Sánchez Parra as El Buitre
 Manuel Balbi as Víctor Cruz
 Gerardo Taracena as Mauro Tapias
 Enoc Leaño as Mario Urdaneta

References

External links 
 

2014 Mexican television series debuts
2014 Mexican television series endings
2014 Colombian television series debuts
2014 Colombian television series endings
2014 American television series debuts
2014 American television series endings
Mexican television series
Colombian television series
Spanish-language television shows
Sony Pictures Television telenovelas
Television shows remade overseas
Television series by Teleset